McKinley House or McKinley Home may refer to:

Johnson Camden McKinley House, a historic house in Wheeling, West Virginia
McKinley Birthplace Home and Research Center, birthplace of U.S. President William McKinley, Niles, Ohio